The Hollywood Music In Media Awards (HMMA) is an award organization honoring original music (Song and Score) in all forms visual media including film, TV, video games, trailers, commercial advertisements, documentaries, music videos and special programs. The HMMA was the first to include Outstanding Music Supervision as featured award categories. HMMA nominations and winners have historically been representative of key awards shows announced months later. The annual HMMA main event, held the week before Thanksgiving, features live music performances, celebrity presenters, tributes to music industry icons and awards for composers, songwriters and performers. The HMMA also celebrates emerging, independent artists from around the globe for creative and innovative contributions in genre categories. The 2019 winners were announced on November 20.

Categories

Score
 Best Original Score – Feature Film
 Best Original Score – Independent Film
 Best Original Score – Animated Film
 Best Original Score – Sci-Fi/Fantasy Film
 Best Original Score – Horror Film
 Best Original Score – Documentary
 Best Original Score – Independent Film (Foreign Language)
 Best Original Score – TV Show/Limited Series
 Best Original Score – Animated Short Film
 Best Original Score – Documentary Short Film
 Best Original Score – Video Game
 Best Original Score/Song – Mobile Game

Song
 Best Original Song – Feature Film
 Best Original Song – Independent Film
 Best Original Song – Animated Film

 Best Original Song – Documentary
 Best Original Song – TV Show/Limited Series
 Best Original Song – Video Game
 Best Original Song/Score – Commercial Advertisement
 Best Original Song – Short Film
 Best Original Song – Onscreen Performance

Music Supervision
 Best Music Supervision – Film
 Best Music Supervision – Television

Other
 Best Music Documentary/Special Program
 Best Educational/Entertainment Exhibits or Theme Park Rides
 Best Main Title Theme — TV Show/Limited Series
 Best Main Title Theme — TV Show (Foreign Language)
 Best Music Video (Independent)
 Best Live Concert for Visual Media

Selected winners

2014
 Original Score – Feature Film – Antonio Sanchez (Birdman)
 Original Score – Sci-Fi/Fantasy Film – Howard Shore (The Hobbit: The Desolation of Smaug)
 Original Score – Indie Film/Short – Julia Pajot (Impulsion)
 Original Score – Animated Film – John Powell (How to Train Your Dragon 2)
 Original Score – Documentary – Mark Adler (Merchants of Doubt)
 Song – Feature Film – "Lost Stars" (Begin Again) Written by Gregg Alexander & Danielle Brisebois
 Song – Animated Film – "Everything Is Awesome" (The Lego Movie) Written by JoLi, The Lonely Island, & Shawn Patterson
 Song – Documentary – "Coming Home" (Stopping for Death: The Nurses of Wells House Hospice) Written by Joel Martin
 Soundtrack Album – Guardians of the Galaxy (Various Artists)
 Outstanding Music Supervision – Television – Michelle Kuznetsky & Bob Thiele Jr. (Sons of Anarchy)
 Outstanding Music Supervision – Film – Season Kent (The Fault in Our Stars)
 Lifetime Achievement Award – Glen Campbell

Source:

2015
 Original Score – Feature Film – Dan Romer (Beasts of No Nation)
 Original Score – Sci-Fi/Fantasy Film – Junkie XL (Mad Max: Fury Road)
 Original Score – Independent Film – Isaias Garcia (The Moment I Was Alone)
 Original Score – Animated Film – Christophe Beck (The Peanuts Movie)
 Original Score – Documentary – Miriam Cutler (The Hunting Ground)
 Original Score – Short – Josue Vergara (Superheroes)
 Song – Feature Film – "See You Again" (Furious 7) Written by Andrew Cedar, DJ Frank E, Wiz Khalifa, & Charlie Puth
 Song – Animated Film – "Dancing in the Dark" (Home) Written by Ester Dean, Tor Erik Hermansen, MoZella, & Rihanna
 Song – Documentary – "Til It Happens to You" (The Hunting Ground) Written by Lady Gaga & Diane Warren
 Soundtrack Album – Fifty Shades of Grey (Various Artists)
 Outstanding Music Supervision – Television – Jen Ross (Empire)
 Outstanding Music Supervision – Film – Dana Sano (Fifty Shades of Grey)
 Outstanding Career Achievement Award – Earth, Wind & Fire

Source:

2016
 Original Score – Feature Film – Nicholas Britell (Moonlight)
 Original Score – Sci/Fi Fantasy Film – John Debney (The Jungle Book)
 Original Score – Independent Film – Scott Glasgow (The Curse of Sleeping Beauty)
 Original Score – Animated Film – Alexandre Desplat (The Secret Life of Pets)
 Original Score – Documentary – Mark Adler (Command and Control)
 Original Score – Short – Mariano Saulino (The Talk)
 Song Feature Film – "City of Stars" (La La Land) Written by Justin Hurwitz & Pasek & Paul.
 Song Animated Film – "Can't Stop the Feeling!" (Trolls) Written by Max Martin, Shellback, & Justin Timberlake.
 Song Documentary – “A Minute to Breathe” (Before the Flood) Written by Trent Reznor & Atticus Ross
 Song Sci-Fi, Fantasy, Horror Film - "Just like Fire" (Alice Through the Looking Glass) Written by Pink, Max Martin, Shellback & Oscar Holter
 Soundtrack Album – Suicide Squad (Various Artists)
 Soundtrack Contemporary Classical / Instrumental -  (Believe)
Source:

2017
 Original Score – Feature Film – Oneohtrix Point Never (Good Time)
 Original Score – Sci/Fi Fantasy Film – Alexandre Desplat (The Shape of Water)
 Original Score – Independent Film – Corey Allen Jackson (Chuck)
 Original Score – Animated Film – Michael Giacchino (Coco)
 Original Score – Documentary – Philip Glass (Jane)
 Original Score – Short – David Longoria (Becoming a Man)
 Original Score – Video Game – Stephen Cox & Danny McIntyre (Farpoint)
 Original Song – Video Game – Thomas Parisch (composer) & Dimash Kudaibergen (singer) (Ocean over the Time (from Moonlight Blade video game))
 Song/Score – Mobile Video Game – Jonathan Geer (The Franz Kafka Videogame)
 Song Feature Film – "Stand Up for Something" (Marshall) Written by Diane Warren & Lonnie Lynn
 Song Animated Film – "Confident" (Leap) – Written by Demi Lovato, Ilya Salmanzadeh, Max Martin & Savan Kotecha
 Song Documentary – “Jump” (Step) Written by Raphael Saadiq, Taura Stinson, & Laura Karpman
 Song Independent Film – “Speak To Me” (Voice from the Stone) Written by Amy Lee
 Song Sci-Fi, Fantasy, Horror Film – "How Does a Moment Last Forever" (Beauty and the Beast) – Written by Alan Menken & Tim Rice
 Soundtrack Album – Baby Driver (Various Artists)
 Outstanding Music Supervision Television – Robin Urdang (The Marvelous Mrs. Maisel)
 Outstanding Music Supervision Film – Brian Ross (Lady Bird)
Source:

2018
 Original Score – Feature Film – Max Richter (Mary Queen of Scots)
 Original Score – Sci/Fi Fantasy Film – Ludwig Goransson (Black Panther)
 Original Score – Animated Film – Alexandre Desplat (Isle of Dogs)
 Original Score – Documentary – Cyrille Aufort (March of the Penguins: The Next Step)
 Original Song – Feature Film – "Shallow" (A Star is Born) Written by Lady Gaga, Mark Ronson, Anthony Rossomando, and Andrew Wyatt. Performed by Lady Gaga and Bradley Cooper
 Original Song – Documentary – "I’ll Fight" (RBG). Written by Diane Warren. Performed by Jennifer Hudson
 Original Song – Animated Film – "Stronger Than I Ever Was" (Sherlock Gnomes). Written by Elton John & Bernie Taupin. Performed by Mary J. Blige
 Original Song – Sci-Fi, Fantasy, Horror Film – "All the Stars" (Black Panther). Written by Kendrick Lamar, SZA, Sounwave, and Al Shux. Performed by Kendrick Lamar and SZA
 Music Documentary/Special Program – Quincy
 Original Score – TV Show/Limited Series – Nicholas Britell (Succession)
 Main Title Theme – TV Show/Limited Series – Carlos Rafael Rivera (Godless)
 Outstanding Music Supervision – Film – Julianne Jordan & Julia Michels (A Star is Born)
 Outstanding Music Supervision – Television – Jen Ross (Power)
 Soundtrack Album – Black Panther (Various Artists)
 Original Score – Independent Film – Thomas Ades (Colette)
 Original Song – Independent Film – "Requiem For a Private War" (A Private War). Written and performed by Annie Lennox
 Original Score – Short Film – Nami Melumad (Passage)
 Original Score – Video Game – Jeff Broadbent and Tina Guo (Extinction)
 Original Song – Video Game – "Only We Few Remember it Now" (The Banner Saga 3). Written by Austin Wintory. Featuring Faroese singer Eivør
 Song/Score – Trailer – Pawel Gorniak (Crossfire 2)
 Original Score – Short Film (Foreign Language) – Jessica Yap (Sigek Cokelat – A Chocolate Bar)
 Original Song/Score – Mobile Video Game – Matthew Carl Earl (Arena of Valor: Flip the World)
 Original Song/Score – Commercial Advertisement – Juliet Roberts (NBA Finals – Finally Mine)
 Original Score – Independent Film (Foreign Language) – Joan Vilà (Quien Eres)
 Independent Music Video – Alex Boyé (Bend Not Break)
 Original Song – TV Show/Mini Series – The Innocents (The Innocents). Music and lyrics by Carly Paradis. Performed by EERA (Anna Lena Bruland)
 Live Concert for Visual Media – Landmarks Live in Concert – Foo Fighters, Live from the Acropolis
 Main Title – TV Show (Foreign Language) – Layal Watfeh (Ten Sins)
 Original Score – Short Film (Animated) – Mariano Saulino (Very Loving Caterpillar)

Source:

2019 

 Original Score – Feature Film (Tie!) – Hildur Guðnadóttir (JOKER), Marco Beltrami | Buck Sanders (FORD V FERRARI)
 Original Score – Sci/Fi Fantasy Film – Alan Silvestri (AVENGERS: ENDGAME)
 Original Score – Horror Film – Michael Abels (US)
 Original Score – Animated Film – John Powell (HOW TO TRAIN YOUR DRAGON: THE HIDDEN WORLD)
 Original Score – Documentary – Jeff Beal (THE BIGGEST LITTLE FARM)
 Original Song – Feature Film – “Stand Up” from HARRIET
 Original Song – Documentary – "Sun, Flood, or Drought" From THE BIGGEST LITTLE FARM
 Original Song – Animated Film – "Beautiful Life" from ABOMINABLE
 Music Documentary/Special Program – ECHO IN THE CANYON 
 Original Score – TV Show/Limited Series – Kris Bowers (WHEN THEY SEE US)
 Main Title Theme – TV Show/Limited Series – Steven Price (OUR PLANET)
 Outstanding Music Supervision – Film – Mary Ramos (ONCE UPON A TIME...IN HOLLYWOOD)
 Outstanding Music Supervision – TV – Catherine Grieves & David Holmes (KILLING EVE)
 Outstanding Music Supervision – Video Game – Keith Leary, Peter Scaturro and Alex Hackford (DAYS GONE)
 Soundtrack Album – RED DEAD REDEMPTION 2 - VA OST  
 Original Score – Independent Film – Dara Taylor (COLEWELL)
 Original Song – Independent Film – Lionel Cohen & Ollie Gabriel - "She's Setting Fire to the Floor" from MOB TOWN
 Original Score – Short Film – J. M. Quintana Cámara – PAPER BOATS
 Original Score – Short Film (Animated) – Amie Doherty (MAROONED)
 Original Score – Video Game – Sarah Schachner (CALL OF DUTY: MODERN WARFARE)
 Original Song – Video Game – "Saudade" (feat. Shim) (RESIDENT EVIL 2)
 Song/Score – Trailer – Mark Hannah – ROMA (Official Trailer)
 Original Score – Short Film (Foreign Language) – Jesica Yap (HOME)
 Original Song/Score – Mobile Video Game – Inon Zur (THE ELDER SCROLLS: BLADES)
 Original Song/Score – Commercial Advertisement – "Main Attraction" (JEEP GRAND CHEROKEE)
 Independent Music Video – Ndlovu Youth Choir & Wouter Kellerman
 Adult Contemporary/AAA – Marina V & Dan Navarro
 Alternative – AMbassadors of Morning
 Americana/Folk/Acoustic – Charlie Millikin
 Blues – Bushmaster featuring Gary Brown
 Children's Music – Kendra K
 Christian/Gospel – Kitt Wakeley
 Contemporary Classical – Sandrine Rudaz
 Country – Charly Reynolds
 Dance – Art Tawanghar
 Downbeat/Downtempo – Polar RundFunk
 EDM (Electronic Dance Music) – NIK:11 & VODZILLA
 Holiday – Rehya Stevens
 Instrumental – AM Dandy
 Jazz – David Longoria & Barbara Morrison
 Latin (Pop/Rock/Urban) – Dian Rene
 Latin (Traditional) – Mariachi Divas de Cindy Shea
 Lyrics/Lyricist – [Alexa Ray]
 Message Song/Social Impact – J.ournal featuring the Rogue Pianist
 New Age/Ambient – Juliet Lyons
 Pop – Olivia Rox
 Producer/Production – Xandy Barry & Fakelife
 R&B/Soul – Shawn Stockman
 Rap/Hip Hop – FKM ft. J.O.K.E.S.
 Reggae – Analea Brown
 Rock – Joshua & The Holy Rollers
 Singer-Songwriter – J Edna Mae
 Vocal (Female) – Shelita
 Vocal (Male) – Logan Henderson
 World – Angham

Source:

2020

2021

2022

References

External links

 
November events
Awards established in 2014
2014 establishments in California